Trukhanov or Truhanov (feminine: Trukhanova,Truhanova) is an East Slavic surname. Notable people with the surname include:

Gennadiy Trukhanov (born 1965), Ukrainian politician
Kostiantyn Trukhanov (born 1976), Ukrainian football referee and player
Victor Truhanov (born 1991), Moldovan footballer